This is a list of museums in the Dutch capital of Amsterdam:

Allard Pierson Museum, archeological museum of the University of Amsterdam
Amsterdam Centre for Architecture (ARCAM)
Amsterdam Dungeon
Amsterdam Museum, formerly (up to 2011) Amsterdams Historisch Museum
Amsterdam Tulip Museum
Anne Frank House
Appie Baantjer Museum
Beurs van Berlage
Bibliotheca Philosophica Hermetica, exceptional old books
Bijbels Museum, also known as the Cromhouthuizen
Willem Bilderdijk museum, part of the department Special Collections, University Library Vrije Universiteit, visit only on appointment
Brilmuseum, museum about glasses
Diamond Museum Amsterdam
Electric Ladyland, museum of fluorescent art
Electrische Museumtramlijn Amsterdam
Energetica, closed; collection was transferred to NEMO
Erotisch Museum, Oudezijds Achterburgwal
Ethnographisch Museum Artis, collection was transferred to the Tropenmuseum)
Fashion for Good Museum
Filmmuseum,  also known as Eye Film Instituut Nederland
Foam Fotografiemuseum Amsterdam
The Greenbox Museum of Contemporary Art from Saudi Arabia
Hash, Marihuana & Hemp Museum
Heineken Experience
Hermitage Amsterdam
Het Glazen Huis (Amstelpark)
Het Huis van Aristoteles
Het Schelpenmuseum Amsterdam
Hollandsche Manege, not a museum itself but contains the Levend Paardenmuseum.
Hollandsche Schouwburg
Hortus Botanicus
House of Bols, cocktail experience
Huis Marseille, Museum for Photography
Imagine Identity and Culture, about culture and migration
Joods Historisch Museum
KattenKabinet
Kröller-Müller Museum
Koffie- en Theemuseum Geels & Co.
Madame Tussauds Amsterdam
Max Euwe-Centrum, museum about chess and the only Dutch chess champion
Medieval Torture Museum
Micropia
Moco Museum (Modern Contemporary Museum Amsterdam)
Molen van Sloten, containing the Kuiperijmuseum
Multatuli Museum
Museum De Noord
Museum Geelvinck-Hinlopen  Huis
Museum Het Grachtenhuis
Museum Het Schip
Nederlands Uitvaart Museum Tot Zover, museum about funerals
Museum Van Loon
, at the AMC Amsterdam
Museum Willet-Holthuysen

Netherlands Media Art Institute (NIMk)
Nederlands Scheepvaartmuseum, museum about shipping
NEMO science center, former Nederlands Instituut voor Nijverheid en Techniek
Nieuwe Kerk
Noorder Kerk
Olympic Experience Amsterdam, sports museum
Ons' Lieve Heer op Solder, also known as Museum Amstelkring 
Oranje Voetbal Museum
Oude Kerk
Royal Palace of Amsterdam
Pianola Museum
Pijpenkabinet & Smokiana
Press Museum, affiliated with the International Institute of Social History
Rembrandt House Museum
Rijksmuseum
Rijksmuseum Amsterdam op Schiphol
Rijksprentenkabinet, houses in the Rijksmuseum, but can be visited separately
Sex museum, The temple of Venus, Damrak
SMART Project Space, in the former pathological laboratory of the former Wilhelmina Gasthuis
Special Collections of the University Library of Amsterdam
Stadsarchief Amsterdam, city archive
Stedelijk Museum / Stedelijk Museum Bureau Amsterdam (SMBA)
Tassenmuseum Hendrikje (Museum of Bags and Purses)
Tattoo Museum
Theatermuseum, closed
Theo Thijssen Museum, museum about the writer, teacher and socialist politician
Torture Museum
Tropenmuseum
Vakbondsmuseum, in De Burcht, trade union museum in the oldest trade union building in the Netherlands
Van Eesterenmuseum
Van Gogh Museum
Vereniging Museumhaven Amsterdam
Verzetsmuseum, resistance museum
Vodka Museum Amsterdam
Werf 't Kromhout, one of few shipyards still in use in Amsterdam
Witsenkamer, in the house of Willem Witsen
Woonboot Museum, houseboat museum
World of Ajax
Zoological Museum Amsterdam of the University of Amsterdam
Zuiderkerk

See also
List of museums in the Netherlands
List of most visited museums in the Netherlands

References

External links

IAmsterdam: Places to go

 
Museums
Amsterdam
Amsterdam